Madonna del Ghisallo is a hill in Magreglio, close to Lake Como in Italy. It is named after an alleged Marian apparition.

According to the legend, the Medieval count Ghisallo was travelling by the hamlet of Magréglio when he was attacked by bandits. He saw an image of Virgin Mary at a shrine, ran to it and was saved from the robbers. The apparition became known as La Madonna del Ghisallo, and she became a patroness of local travellers.

In later times, the hill Madonna del Ghisallo was made part of the Giro di Lombardia bicycle race and has often featured in the Giro d'Italia as well. The church sits atop a steep hill that climbs up from the shores of Lake Como. It became a natural stopping point for cyclists.

For this reason a local priest, Father Ermelindo Vigano, proposed that La Madonna del Ghisallo be declared the patroness of cyclists. This was confirmed by Pope Pius XII. Nowadays the shrine of Madonna del Ghisallo contains a small cycling museum with photos and artifacts from the sport. There also burns an eternal flame for cyclists who have died. One particularly notable artifact is the crumpled bicycle that Fabio Casartelli, a native of the region, rode on the day that he died in a crash in the Tour de France.

The church is home to many bikes and cycling jerseys used by cyclists in races. The Fondazione Museo del Ciclismo-Madonna del Ghisallo was created in 2000. Its first action was to organize a torch relay from the chapel to the Vatican, delivering the torch to the then Pope John Paul II. In 2010 a bike museum, the Museo del Ciclismo, opened nearby.

The Colle del Ghisallo is a mountain pass road that connects the upper part of Valassina Larian Triangle. The point of the pass, at an altitude of 754 m above sea level, is located near Magreglio.

See also
 Notre Dame des Cyclistes

References

External links 
 Museo del Ciclismo Madonna del Ghisallo 
 Passo del Ghisallo profile at Climbbybike.com

Churches in the province of Como
Giro di Lombardia
Marian apparitions
Shrines to the Virgin Mary